Michael Elliott (17 July 1946 – 23 December 2014), also known as Mike the Mouth, was an English stand-up comedian, actor, television presenter, radio personality and comedian.

On 23 December 2014 Elliott died of esophageal cancer at age 68.

Early life
Elliott was born in Sunderland. He attended St Cuthbert's RC Primary in Grindon, Sunderland, and St Aidan's RC Grammar School in Ashbrooke, Sunderland. He later taught English and Drama  at Hartlepool's Dyke House School.

Elliot was part of The Northern Front Folk Band which was really just a year long experiment with something called “folk music hall”. To this end a club was started in The Londonderry pub in Sunderland – with Elliott being the driving force as organiser and compere. The group with Mike alongside both Ed Pickford and Nick Fenwick were amazingly popular on the folk music circuit.

In 1983, he first found national fame on At Last, It's Mike Elliott, broadcast on Channel 4. For several years, he was a mainstay of Lindisfarne's UK tours, working as warm up and compere. 

He released two albums on Newcastle-based Rubber Records: Out of the Brown RUB 025 (1976) and At Last It's Mike Elliott RUB 044 (1982).
In 1992, Elliott returned to work for Tyne Tees Television, presenting a number of regional documentary series, including Down Colliery Way, about miners in England's northeast.

Acting
Elliott had a number of acting roles, including the boxing coach George Watson in Billy Elliot, and a number of roles in television drama series, including Crocodile Shoes, Byker Grove, Spender, Harry, and New Voices. He played a taxi driver in Goal and Goal! 3: Taking on the World.

Radio
In February 1995, Elliott was given a new nickname as "Mike the Mouth" when he launched the first late night talk show on 100-102 Century FM in the North East. He was suspended in his first year at the station for swearing at a woman caller who said she was a benefits swindler, but was reinstated after fans protested outside of the station's studios in Gateshead. In January 2000, he was taken off the air in the middle of his show, following an expletive-filled outburst at a caller. Bosses sacked him, assuming, from his behavior and slurred speech, that he was drunk. However, Elliott claimed that his "strange behavior" was caused by combining two glasses of wine during a family meal with the cold remedies Benylin and Night Nurse. In June that year, he was reinstated by the station.

In 2001, he launched a board game called Social Insecurity, with some similarities to Monopoly.

In December 2002, a new Mike Elliott radio show launched on North East Magic Radio in the same slot as his previous program. However, on MW, it failed to gain the same number of listeners that the Century FM series had achieved and Elliott was released from his contract in July 2003. In December 2003, Elliott went back on air on Sunderland's Sun FM. In January 2006, the series was re-branded North South Divided, pitching the northern stations of the Local Radio Company against their southern counterparts. Broadcast over almost 30 stations, this was the first time listeners outside of the North East had a taste of Elliott, alongside another presenter, Alex Dyke (who was later replaced by Carol McGiffin). On 5 July 2006, North South Divided ended.

Death

On 23 December 2014, Elliott died of esophageal cancer at age 68.

References

External links
 
 Interview on Lindisfarne site

1946 births
2014 deaths
20th-century English male actors
21st-century English male actors
English male comedians
English male film actors
English male television actors
English radio personalities
People from Sunderland
Comedians from Tyne and Wear
Male actors from Tyne and Wear
Deaths from esophageal cancer
Deaths from cancer in England
Place of death missing